Nuestro pequeño mundo (English: Our little world) is a Mexican telenovela produced by Televisa for Telesistema Mexicano in 1966.

Cast 
Susana Cabrera
José Gálvez
Carmen Molina
Andrea Cotto
Luis Bayardo
Carlos Ancira

References

External links 

Mexican telenovelas
1966 telenovelas
Televisa telenovelas
Spanish-language telenovelas
1966 Mexican television series debuts
1966 Mexican television series endings